Estelle Sapir (1923 or 1926 – 13 April 1999) was a Polish Jewish Holocaust survivor who achieved a measure of fame for her successful battle with the Swiss banking industry, in particular Credit Suisse, after a half-century of fighting for the return of her family's money, which had been deposited by her father, Józef Sapir, before he was murdered in the Nazi concentration camp at Majdanek during World War II.

In 1998, Credit Suissewhich had demanded her father's death certificate, which did not exist due to the circumstances of his murder in a concentration camp, in order to release the fundsand Estelle Sapir jointly announced that the case was settled. The amount was not disclosed due to a confidentiality agreement but has been estimated at $500,000 USD.

Sapir died in 1999 in Rockaway Park, Queens, New York from a heart attack after a period of poor health. She never married and was survived by two nieces and a nephew. She maintained her Polish citizenship until her death and was a permanent resident alien in the United States, not a naturalized U.S. citizen, unlike her fellow co-plaintiffs.

References

1920s births
1999 deaths
20th-century Polish Jews
Polish emigrants to the United States
People from Queens, New York
Holocaust survivors